Jared Seth Jones (born October 3, 1994) is an American professional ice hockey defenseman and alternate captain for the Chicago Blackhawks of the National Hockey League (NHL). He was selected fourth overall by the Nashville Predators in the 2013 NHL Entry Draft. After two seasons playing for the United States National Team Development Program, Jones joined the Western Hockey League's (WHL) Portland Winterhawks.  

Jones has represented the United States several times internationally. He won back-to-back gold medals at the 2011 and 2012 IIHF World U18 Championships. He was a member of the 2013 World Junior Ice Hockey Championships team that won a gold medal.

Early life
Jones was born in Arlington, Texas, to Amy and Ronald "Popeye" Jones, when his father was a member of the National Basketball Association's (NBA) Dallas Mavericks. He is the middle of the couple's three children, all sons, with Justin being older and Caleb younger.  Jones began playing hockey at the age of five when the family was living in Denver, Colorado, while his father was playing for the Nuggets. Justin wanted to play inline hockey with friends. Justin and Seth were given inline skates and in the winter received ice hockey skates. Not knowing much about ice hockey, Popeye asked Hockey Hall of Famer Joe Sakic, then playing in Denver with the Colorado Avalanche, for advice to help his sons become better players after running into him at the Pepsi Center, where both of their respective teams played. Sakic told Popeye to have his sons work on their skating, knowing they would likely have size and natural athleticism. As a result, Seth took skating classes for a year before he began playing organized hockey at age six. He was in attendance for Game 7 when the Avalanche won the Stanley Cup in 2001.

Playing career

Amateur
Jones began playing organized ice hockey with local teams in Denver and playing with travel teams when he was eight years old. He played in the 2005, 2006 and 2007 Quebec International Pee-Wee Hockey Tournaments with three different minor ice hockey teams from Colorado. He and his family moved back to Texas when Jones was 12. At the same time he decided he wanted to play for the United States National Team Development Program (NTDP). He played for the Dallas Stars Bantam Major team, scoring 33 points in 31 games. In the 2009 Bantam draft the Everett Silvertips selected Jones eleventh overall. He was projected to be a higher pick in the draft, but concerns that he would choose to play college hockey over the Western Hockey League (WHL) caused him to be selected lower. After being drafted Jones played another season in Dallas, with the Stars U-18 team before joining the NTDP.

In his first season with the NTDP Jones spent time with both the under 17 and under 18 teams. He served as co-captain of the U-17 team. Jones registered 21 points in 37 games of the NTDP season, which included league play in the United States Hockey League (USHL), plus international play and games against division II and III National Collegiate Athletic Association (NCAA) teams. His 21 points led the team in defense scoring. He continued to serve as co-captain the following season, but slipped to second on the team in defense scoring registering 31 points in 52 total games. After his second season Jones needed to choose whether to play his draft year in the NCAA or with the Silvertips in the WHL. Jones decided that Everett was not a good fit for him and was expected to attend the University of North Dakota. After being informed that Jones would not play for them the Silvertips traded the rights to talk to Jones to the Portland Winterhawks for a conditional bantam draft pick, but retained his rights. Two weeks later, Portland signed Jones and traded two signed players and the rights for two more players to officially complete the trade for acquiring his rights. While playing for Portland, Jones was projected to be a top selection in the 2013 National Hockey League (NHL) Entry Draft. At the season's mid-way point the NHL Central Scouting ranked Jones as the number one prospect among North American Skaters and the International Scouting Services listed him first overall.

Jones finished the season with 14 goals and 56 points in 61 games. In the playoffs Portland won the Ed Chynoweth Cup as champions of the WHL. In the Memorial Cup tournament the Winterhawks advanced to the final, where they faced the Halifax Mooseheads. In the final Jones scored a goal in a 6–4 loss, draft rivals Nathan MacKinnon and Jonathan Drouin each recorded 5 points for Halifax. Jones finished the playoffs with 5 goals and 15 points in 21 games. He was named to the First All-Star Team of the Western Conference and won the Jim Piggott Memorial Trophy as WHL rookie of the year.

Heading into the draft Jones was again named the number one overall prospect. Despite the ranking, the Avalanche, who held the top pick, announced that they would not select Jones and used it to draft Halifax Mooseheads forward Nathan MacKinnon. At the draft Jones slid to the fourth overall pick where he was selected by the Nashville Predators. A month later the Predators of the NHL signed Jones to a three-year entry-level contract.

Professional

Nashville Predators
Jones made his National Hockey League debut with the Nashville Predators on October 3, 2013, against the St. Louis Blues. Jones scored his first NHL goal on October 12, 2013 against Evgeni Nabokov of the New York Islanders.

Columbus Blue Jackets
During the last year of his entry-level contract in the 2015–16 season, on January 6, 2016, Jones was traded by the Predators to the Columbus Blue Jackets in exchange for center Ryan Johansen. At the time of the trade, he had scored 63 points in 199 NHL games.

On June 29, 2016, as an impending restricted free agent, Jones agreed to a long-term extension, signing a six-year, $32.4 million contract to remain with the Blue Jackets.

During the 2016–17 season, Jones was placed on injured reserve due to a hairline fracture in his right foot. Prior to the injury, he led the Blue Jackets in ice time. Jones was activated off injured reserve after missing six games, and ended the season with career highs in assists, goals, and points.

During the 2017–18 season, Jones developed into one of the Blue Jackets top defenseman, playing an average of 24:36 minutes per game. As a result of his hard work, Jones was selected to represent the Metropolitan Division at the 2018 NHL All-Star Game. However, he could not make it due to illness and fellow Blue Jackets defenseman Zach Werenski replaced him. At the conclusion of the season, Jones tied with Werenski for most goals in franchise history by a defenseman in a season, with 16. Prior to the 2018–19 season, Jones suffered a second-degree MCL sprain during a preseason game against the Buffalo Sabres, causing him to miss the first 7 games.

In February 2020, Jones was placed on long-term injured reserve after undergoing ankle surgery. However, he was able to return when the season resumed for the postseason, being activated off injured reserve on June 18, 2020 and deemed eligible to play in the Stanley Cup playoffs. During Game 1 of the team's first-round match-up against the Tampa Bay Lightning, Jones skated an NHL-record 65:06 during a 3-2 quintuple overtime loss.

Chicago Blackhawks
On July 23, 2021, Jones, along with Tampa Bay's first-round pick in the 2021 NHL Entry Draft and a sixth-round pick, was traded to the Chicago Blackhawks in exchange for Adam Boqvist, Chicago's first-round pick in 2021, Chicago's second-round pick in the 2021 Draft, and the Blackhawks' first-round pick in either 2022 or 2023.

On July 28, Jones signed an eight-year, $76 million contract extension with the Blackhawks.

International play

Jones first represented the United States at the 2010 Under-17 (U-17) Four Nations Cup. In the tournament Jones scored a goal and registered four points, helping Team USA to a first-place finish. He next represented USA in the 2011 World U-17 Hockey Challenge. Team USA finished the preliminary round undefeated winning all four of their games. In their semi-final game Team USA defeated Canada's Pacific team 6–5 in overtime to advance to the gold medal game. In the Championship game Team USA was defeated 5–3, finishing the tournament as the silver medal winners. In the loss Jones was named the player of the game for the United States. Jones finished the tournament scoring a goal and two points. He was named to the tournament all-star team. Later in the year Jones joined Team USA for the 2011 IIHF World U18 Championships. The United States went undefeated in the preliminary round and the semi-final advancing the gold medal game. In the championship game Team USA faced a two-goal deficit in the third period. The Americans came back eventually tying the game with 1:29 remaining to force overtime. USA scored four minutes into overtime to win the gold medal. Jones finished the tournament with three assists in six games.

As a 17-year-old Jones was selected to play on the United States 2012 World Junior Ice Hockey Championships team, but was unable to play due to an injury. He returned to international competition at the 2012 IIHF World U18 Championships, where he captained Team USA. The American team was again undefeated in the tournament allowing only four total goals in their six games of the completion. It was the United States fourth straight gold medal at the Under 18 tournament. Jones finished with 3 goals and 8 points in the 6 games, he was twice named player of the game for Team USA, and was selected by the coaches as one of the team's top three players.

For the 2013 World Junior Ice Hockey Championships Jones was named one of Team USA's alternate captains. In a pre-tournament interview Jones stated that he felt the Americans were the best team, despite Canada being heavily favored. Team USA started the tournament with a win, but lost consecutive games to Russia and Canada. With a 1–2 record Team USA needed a win against Slovakia to avoid being send to the relegation round. The Americans won the game 9–3 and advanced to the medal round. In the playoff round USA defeated the Czech Republic and the Canadians to earn a spot in the gold medal game. In the championship game Jones had a bouncing puck go through his legs which helped Sweden take a 1–0 lead in the second period. Team USA rallied to win the game 3–1. Offensively Jones registered seven points in seven games and finished seventeenth in tournament scoring. He finished third overall in plus-minus with a +8 rating.

Personal life
Jones' father is former National Basketball Association (NBA) power forward and current Denver Nuggets assistant coach Ronald "Popeye" Jones. He has two brothers. His younger brother, Caleb, also plays for the  Chicago Blackhawks.

Career statistics

Regular season and playoffs

International

Awards and honors

NHL record
 Most time on ice by a defenseman in one playoff game: 65:06 (August 11, 2020)

References

External links

 

1994 births
Living people
African-American ice hockey players
American men's ice hockey defensemen
Chicago Blackhawks players
Columbus Blue Jackets players
Ice hockey people from Texas
Ice hockey people from Denver
Nashville Predators draft picks
Nashville Predators players
National Hockey League All-Stars
National Hockey League first-round draft picks
Portland Winterhawks players
Sportspeople from Arlington, Texas
USA Hockey National Team Development Program players